Taghmon is a civil parish in County Westmeath, Ireland.

Taghmon is one of 8 civil parishes in the barony of Corkaree in the Province of Leinster.

Taghmon civil parish comprises 11 townlands: Downs, Farrancallin, Foxburrow, Glebe, Knockatee, Knockdrin, Monkstown, Rathcorbally, Sheefin, Taghmon and Toberaquill.

The neighbouring civil parishes are: Faughalstown (barony of Fore) and Kilkpatrick (Fore) to the north, Rathconnell (barony of Moyashel and Magheradernon) to the east and south and Stonehall and Tyfarnham to the west.

References

External links
Taghmon civil parish at the IreAtlas Townland Data Base
Taghmon civil parish at Townlands.ie
Taghmon civil parish at Logainm.ie

Civil parishes of County Westmeath